Kankalsi may refer to several places in Burkina Faso:

Kankalsi, Bogandé
Kankalsi, Piéla